Len Meltzer (born c. 1930) is a former Canadian football player who played for the Winnipeg Blue Bombers and BC Lions.

References

Living people
1930s births
Canadian football running backs
Winnipeg Blue Bombers players
BC Lions players